Tito and Me (Tito i ja) is a 1992 Yugoslav comedy film by Serbian director Goran Marković.

Plot
The movie is set in communist-ruled Yugoslavia during the 1950s. Zoran is an overweight 10-year-old living in an overcrowded home that his parents share with his grandmother, aunt and uncle. In the early communist era of Yugoslavia, many homes were taken away from their owners in the Land Reform programs. His parents are artists, and do not get along with his aunt and uncle, who think that they are communists.

Zoran's family is opposed to Tito's rule, while little Zoran sees Tito as his personal hero. He's learned in school that Tito is the greatest man ever, and he daydreams about meeting him. One day, Zoran writes a composition called "Why I Like the President", which is judged the best of those submitted by Belgrade's schoolchildren. He wins a week's camping trip with other children of families favored by the regime, the trip's highlight being a reception at Tito's palace. His crush, Jasna, an orphan girl, also is going on this trip.

The camping trip is led by a man named Raja, who quickly seems to be insane. The trip becomes increasingly absurd, with Raja and one of older boys Kengur (kangaroo, a nickname given his height) pretend to be ghosts to scare the kids while they are staying in a historic castle.

Zoran is exposed by Raja for stealing a ring to give Jasna. He is going to be sent home on a train, and as he waits, a girl who is friendly with him walks over to his side. All of the students join, leaving only Raja and Jasna opposing him. They finish the journey and arrive at Tito's childhood home, and Zoran is asked to give a speech. He corrects his poem by saying that he in fact does love his parents more than Tito, and stating that he doesn't even like Tito that much.

The film ends with a banquet where all of the kids get to meet Tito, but Zoran is disillusioned and doesn't really care to meet him.

Awards
Silver Seashell for best director: Goran Marković
Silver Seashell for juvenile acting: Dimitrije Vojnov

Cast
Ilija Bašić as first agent
Olja Bećković as Đura's mother
Voja Brajović as Josip Broz Tito
Branimir Brstina as Strahinja
Milutin Dapčević as Kengur
Bogdan Diklić as uncle
Anica Dobra as mother
Ljiljana Dragutinović as aunt
Nebojša Dugalić as policeman
Dušan Jakšić as second agent
Miki Manojlović as father
Olivera Marković as granny
Rade Marković as grandpa
Jelena Mrdak as Ljilja
Dragan Nikolić as Gane's father
Uroš Nikolić as Đura
Lazar Ristovski as Raja
Goran Smigić as Zoran's colleague
Milivoje Tomić as custos
Miodrag Tomović as Tito's adjutant
Vesna Trivalić as teacher
Dimitrije Vojnov as Zoran
Milena Vukosav as Jasna
Jelena Živković as Svetlana
Zarko Lausevic as Borko
Tamara Vučković as Singer in bar

Production
Scenes depicting Hrvatsko Zagorje were filmed on Fruška Gora, in Serbia, because the War in Croatia already started when the filming took place.

See also 
Yugoslav films

References

External links 

1992 films
1992 comedy-drama films
1990s Serbian-language films
Serbian comedy-drama films
Films set in the 1950s
Films set in Yugoslavia
Films set in Serbia
Films set in Croatia
Films directed by Goran Marković
Yugoslav comedy-drama films
Films about Josip Broz Tito
Serbo-Croatian-language films